Oran Township is located in Logan County, Illinois. As of the 2010 census, its population was 378 and it contained 162 housing units. The community of Beason is located within the township.

Geography

Demographics

References

External links
US Census
City-data.com
Illinois State Archives

Townships in Logan County, Illinois
Townships in Illinois